Dicerapanorpa is a genus of scorpionflies endemic to China. They can be easily recognized by the two anal horns on the posterior margin of the sixth tergum in males.

The anal horns of Dicerapanorpa magna (Chou, 1981) are used to grasp the female's abdomen during mating.

Species
Dicerapanorpa consists of 8 species.

 Dicerapanorpa baiyunshana Zhong et Hua, 2013
 Dicerapanorpa diceras (MacLachlan, 1894)
 Dicerapanorpa kimminsi (Carpenter, 1948)
 Dicerapanorpa magna (Chou in Chou et al., 1981)
 Dicerapanorpa shennongensis Zhong et Hua, 2013
 Dicerapanorpa stotzneri (Esben-Petersen, 1934)
 Dicerapanorpa tjederi (Carpenter, 1938)
 Dicerapanorpa triclada (Qian et Zhou, 2001)

References

Panorpidae
Fauna of China